Horizon Power is a commercially focused, state government-owned, power company that provides power supplies to Western Australia. It is responsible for generating, procuring, distributing and retailing electricity to residential, industrial and commercial customers and resource developments in its service area.

Horizon Power was established in 2006 during reforms to Western Australia's electricity sector. They operate in the Pilbara, Kimberley, Gascoyne/ Mid-West and the Southern Goldfields-Esperance region of Western Australia. Horizon Power’s head office is based in Karratha with regional offices in Broome, Kununurra, Carnarvon, Esperance and Port Hedland, and administrative support delivered from Perth.

Horizon Power are responsible for delivering electricity to 47,000 connections, supplying more than 100,000 residents and more than 10,000 businesses in regional towns and remote communities. They manage 38 systems: the North West Interconnected System (NWIS) in the Pilbara and the connected network between Kununurra, Wyndham and Lake Argyle, and 34 stand-alone systems across regional WA.

Its service area is approximately 2.3 million square kilometres, which means Horizon Power services the biggest area with the fewest customers in the world. For every 53.5 square kilometres of terrain, Horizon Power has one customer.

See also 
 State Energy Commission of Western Australia

References

External links 
  https://www.facebook.com/HorizonPowerWA
 http://www.horizonpower.com.au/
 Government of Western Australia - Office of Energy
 Government of Western Australia - Office of Energy - Electricity Reform Implementation Unit

Electric power infrastructure in Western Australia
Government-owned companies of Western Australia
Electric power distribution network operators in Australia
Government-owned energy companies